Orchid cactus is an English name for a plant which may refer to:

 Epiphyllum hybrid, one of a number of hybrid cacti formed by crosses between Disocactus, Pseudorhipsalis, Selenicereus and Epiphyllum; often collectively called "epiphyllums" or "epis"
 Epiphyllum, one or more of the species of this genus.
 Disocactus ×hybridus, a hybrid cactus often incorrectly called Disocactus ackermannii